Open Circle Theater was a multi-disciplinary performance company in Seattle, Washington.
It was committed to the development of new works and adaptations that spoke to the human condition through fantasy and mythic storytelling. Founded in the early 1990s, the theater established its reputation for unique theater at a small black-box space in a warehouse in the Lake Union/Cascade neighborhood of Seattle, Washington.  Throughout their seasons, Open Circle's resident company united with local directors, musicians, visual artists and performers, to bring fresh insight and invention to their creations of highly physical, ensemble-style theater. One of their popular events was the annual adaptation and production of the works of H. P. Lovecraft for the stage, which reflected their experiments with new and adapted work.

In 2008, due to development in the South Lake Union area where the new campus of Fred Hutchinson Cancer Research Center was set be constructed, the building Open Circle Theater had called home for ten years was torn down.  After a year being itinerant, the company relocated to a space on the second floor of a building in the thriving neighborhood of Belltown, Seattle very close to downtown.  The space opened in October, 2008 with their all new adaptation based on H.P. Lovecraft's works called The Necronomicon.  The company shared the floor with the theater school Freehold.

Despite recent artistic and business management changes and a string of successful shows, the company was unable to maintain financial viability and officially closed in October 2011.

References

In the Kafka Colony Treats All Things Kafkaesque With a Light Touch Review of In the Kafka Colony at Open Circle Theater
All Predictable, Some Fun H. P. Lovecraft, Crushed-Velvet Corniness, and "Naughty" Improv Review of H. P. Lovecraft The Colour Out of Space at Open Circle Theater
 Annual Lovecraft tradition continues at The Open Circle Theater
Seattle Weekly,   January 25, 2006 "Happy 100th, Open Circle. A fringe theater celebrates a milestone."
Seattle Press, May 20, 1999 - Open Circle's "Poona" is Great, but Better Leave the Kids Home Review of Poona the Fuckdog and Other Plays for Children at Open Circle Theater
Seattle Weekly,  December 2, 1998 "The ruling crass" By John Longenbaugh Review of The Naked King at Open Circle Theater
Seattle Weekly, June 9, 2004 "Opening Nights" by Richard Morin Review of "Are We Scared? An Experiment in Child's Play"
 http://www.seattleweekly.com/2004-06-09/arts/opening-nights/

External links
Open Circle Theater Official site.

2011 disestablishments in Washington (state)
Theatre companies in Washington (state)
Culture of Seattle